Todd Woodbridge and Mark Woodforde were the defending champions, but lost in the semifinals this year.

Jacco Eltingh and Paul Haarhuis won the title, defeating Grant Connell and Patrick Galbraith 3–6, 6–2, 7–6 in the final.

Seeds

  Jacco Eltingh /  Paul Haarhuis (champions)
  Todd Woodbridge /  Mark Woodforde (semifinals)
  Grant Connell /  Patrick Galbraith (final)
  Mark Knowles /  Daniel Nestor (semifinals)

Draw

Draw

References
 Draw

1995 Stockholm Open
1995 ATP Tour